Rachelle Kouyo (born 1983) is an Ivorian team handball player. She plays on the Ivorian national team, and participated at the 2011 World Women's Handball Championship in Brazil.

References

1983 births
Living people
Ivorian female handball players